In economics, the isoelastic function for utility, also known as the isoelastic utility function, or power utility function, is used to express utility in terms of consumption or some other economic variable that a decision-maker is concerned with. The isoelastic utility function is a special case of hyperbolic absolute risk aversion and at the same time is the only class of utility functions with constant relative risk aversion, which is why it is also called the CRRA utility function.

It is

When the context involves risk, the utility function is viewed as a von Neumann–Morgenstern utility function, and the parameter  is the degree of relative risk aversion.

The isoelastic utility function is a special case of the hyperbolic absolute risk aversion (HARA) utility functions, and is used in analyses that either include or do not include underlying risk.

Empirical parametrization 

Risk aversion features 

This and only this utility function has the feature of constant relative risk aversion. Mathematically this means that  is a constant, specifically  In theoretical models this often has the implication that decision-making is unaffected by scale.  For instance, in the standard model of one risk-free asset and one risky asset, under constant relative risk aversion the fraction of wealth optimally placed in the risky asset is independent of the level of initial wealth.

Special cases 
 : this corresponds to risk neutrality, because utility is linear in c.

which justifies the convention of using the limiting value u(c) = ln c when .
  → : this is the case of infinite risk aversion.

See also 
 Isoelastic function
 Constant elasticity of substitution
 Exponential utility
 Risk aversion

References

External links
 Wakker, P. P. (2008), Explaining the characteristics of the power (CRRA) utility family. Health Economics, 17: 1329–1344.
Closed form solution of a consumption savings problem with iso-elastic utility

Financial risk modeling
Utility function types